Paul Abbott was a basketball coach for the Northern Colorado Bears from 1916 to 1917, with a one-year record of 5-7 or a .417 win–loss ratio for the school's men's team.

References

19th-century births
20th-century deaths
American men's basketball coaches
Northern Colorado Bears men's basketball coaches